John Rolf Husberg (20 June 1908 - 2 November 1998) was a Swedish film director, cinematographer, screenwriter and actor. Husberg directed over 30 films between 1939 and 1965.

Selected filmography
 Say It with Music (1929)
 Colourful Pages (1931)
 Dear Relatives (1933)
 Marriageable Daughters (1933)
 People of Hälsingland (1933)
 What Do Men Know? (1933)
 Two Men and a Widow (1933)
 The Song to Her (1934)
 Andersson's Kalle (1934)
 The Atlantic Adventure (1934)
 Fired (1934)
 It Pays to Advertise (1936)
 He, She and the Money (1936)
 The Ghost of Bragehus (1936)
 Conscientious Objector Adolf (1936)
 Unfriendly Relations (1936)
 65, 66 and I (1936)
 Witches' Night (1937)
  Russian Flu (1937)
 Adolf Strongarm (1937)
 Happy Vestköping (1937)
 Hotel Paradise (1937)
 Career (1938)
 Between Us Barons (1939)
 A Crime (1940)
 The Bjorck Family (1940)
 Heroes in Yellow and Blue (1940)
 A Real Man (1940)
 The Three of Us (1940)
 The Ghost Reporter (1941)
 We House Slaves (1942)
 Life and Death (1943)
 His Excellency (1944)
Blåjackor (1945)
Barnen från Frostmofjället (1945)
Love Goes Up and Down (1946)
 Evening at the Djurgarden (1946)
Bill Bergson, Master Detective (1947)
Sampo Lappelill (1949)
 Son of the Sea (1949)
 Andersson's Kalle (1950)
 Beef and the Banana (1951)
Bill Bergson and the White Rose Rescue (1953)
 All the World's Delights (1953)
Flottans glada gossar (1954)
En karl i köket (1954)
Luffaren och Rasmus (1955)
 The Stranger from the Sky (1956)
 Moon Over Hellesta (1956)
Räkna med bråk (1957)
 Laila (1958)
 The Koster Waltz (1958)
 The Die Is Cast (1960)
 Heart's Desire (1960)

References

External links

1908 births
1998 deaths
Swedish film directors